The Edea Power Station is a hydroelectric power plant of the Sanaga River near Edéa in Cameroon. It has a power generating capacity of  enough to power over 136,600 homes. Nearly 60% of the power goes to the aluminum smelter.

See also

 List of power stations in Cameroon
 List of power stations in Africa

References

Edea
Hydroelectric power stations in Cameroon